József Horváth (7 August 1947 – 30 September 2022) was a Hungarian handball player who competed in the 1972 Summer Olympics.

Horváth was born in Bátmonostor on 7 August 1947. In 1972, he was part of the Hungarian team which finished eighth in the Olympic tournament. He played four matches. He died in Madrid, Spain on 30 September 2022, at the age of 75.

External links

External links

1947 births
2022 deaths
Hungarian male handball players
Olympic handball players of Hungary
Handball players at the 1972 Summer Olympics
Sportspeople from Bács-Kiskun County